The Basotho National Party is a political party in Lesotho, founded in 1959 in colonial Basutoland as the Basutoland National Party by Leabua Jonathan. He was Prime Minister from the 1965 general election until the 1986 coup d'état.

In the 1993 general election, the BNP received almost 23% of the vote but did not win any seats in the National Assembly, with all 65 seats going to the party's rival, the Basutoland Congress Party (BCP). It suffered a similar defeat in the 1998 general election, in which it won 24.5% of the vote but only one seat in the National Assembly. Due to its lack of success in winning constituencies, the party sought the introduction of proportional representation in deciding the allocation of seats; as a compromise, a mixed system providing for 40 compensatory seats that would be decided through proportional representation (in addition to the 80 constituency seats) was introduced.

Justin Lekhanya, the leader of the 1986 coup, was elected as Party Leader of the BNP at its Conference in March 1999. In the 25 May 2002 general election, the party won 21 compensatory seats through proportional representation with 22.4% of the vote. Since then, the party has been rocked by internal squabbles which have seen it fail to provide an effective opposition within the Lesotho parliament. In the 17 February 2007 general election, the party won only 3 out of 120 seats. Its headquarters is in Maseru, the capital city.

Electoral Performance

References

Political parties established in 1959
Political parties in Lesotho
Basutoland
1959 establishments in Basutoland